Rex Brasher (July 31, 1869 – February 29, 1960) was an American watercolor painter and ornithologist in the vein of John James Audubon and Louis Agassiz Fuertes. Brasher's 875 surviving paintings depicted 1,200 species and sub-species of North American birds with unsurpassed accuracy and detail, representing all the species and sub-species identified in the American Ornithologists’ Union’s Checklist of North American Birds.

Biography 
Born in Brooklyn, Brasher started to paint birds at the age of 16. He traveled throughout the United States, visiting every state in an effort to find birds to paint, betting on horse races and working odd jobs to support his travels. In 1911, he purchased a 150-acre farm, which he called Chickadee Valley, in Kent, Connecticut. In 1924, Brasher completed his magnum opus, Birds and Trees of North America, which was published in a limited run of 100 twelve-volume copies. In 1939, his paintings were exhibited at the Explorers Hall of the National Geographic Society in Washington, D.C.

Brasher died in 1960 at home in Gaylordsville, Connecticut, at the age of 90.

Artwork 
The State of Connecticut purchased Brasher's collection of original paintings in 1941 for $74,000, intending to build a gallery to showcase the collection in Kent Falls State Park. Funding for the gallery never materialized, so the paintings moved to Harkness Memorial State Park in southern Connecticut, where they were exhibited starting in 1953, following a decade in the basement of the Connecticut State Library in Hartford.

The collection was transferred to the University of Connecticut in 1988. It is held at the Thomas J. Dodd Research Center.

References

External links 

 Rex Brasher Association
 Birds and Trees of North America - WorldCat record
 Finding aid to the Rex Brasher Collection – University of Connecticut Archives & Special Collections
 Rex Brasher: Painter of Birds - A Biography by Milton E. Brasher (New York: Rowman & Littlefield, 1962) – HathiTrust
 

1869 births
1960 deaths
American zoologists
American ornithologists
American ornithological writers
American male non-fiction writers
People from Brooklyn
People from Kent, Connecticut
20th-century American painters
Painters from Connecticut
American watercolorists
American male painters
American bird artists
American naturalists
20th-century American male artists